The Twenty-Fifth Legislature of the Territory of Hawaii was a session of the Hawaii Territorial Legislature.  A special session convened in Honolulu, Hawaii, and ran from July 26 until October 15, 1949.

Legislative session
The special session ran from July 26 until October 15, 1949. It passed 67 bills into law. A second special session ran from September 29 until October 13, 1950.  It passed 6 bills into law.

Senators

House of Representatives

References

Notes

Hawaii legislative sessions